Sultan Alam Shah Museum is a museum in Shah Alam, Petaling, Selangor, Malaysia. It is the state museum of Selangor. This museum was opened in 1989 by Sultan Salahuddin Abdul Aziz Shah.

History
The establishment of the State Museum, which is known with reference to the Sultan Alam Shah Museum, began when Sultan Salahuddin Abdul Aziz Shah consented to sign Enactment Selangor #6 Year 1975 on 27 December 1975.

After several years of planning, the museum opened on 2 September 1989, the museum became a symbol of the state's cultural development and was officially opened by the Sultan of Selangor where the opening ceremony is done with a full event consisting of Malay traditions. Museum administration was placed under the responsibility of the Selangor Museum.

Building
The Museum building was built on a land area of 12.95 hectares and a floor space of 41,538 square meters. This five-storey building consists of two floors of office space, three floors of exhibition space and the Menambun Daeng Exhibition Hall. There are five pavilions which are the History Centre, House of Culture, Sports Centre, Nature and Heritage Centre Islamic Centre and Outdoor Exhibition. The museum is also equipped with facilities such as the Resource Centre, Auditorium, Lumu King Hall, Meeting Room Daeng Perani and Kemasik, Taksedemi Laboratory and Repository.

Exhibits
 Arts & Culture: The unique culture and lifestyle of various ethnic groups in Selangor like Malays and including Bugis, Javanese, Minangkabau, Banjar, Mandailing, Rawa and others are highlighted through traditional, literary and artistic displays including dioramas, clothing, musical instruments, tools and weapons.
 Environmental: Selangor rich biodiversity is illustrated through preserved animal specimens and life-like dioramas.
 Historical: Contains prehistoric artifacts found near early human settlements in the state.
 Islamic: Focuses on the history, arrival and growth of Islam in Selangor. Some of the artifacts on display include models of old mosques, pulpits, drums, domes, ablution jars, pottery, utensils, weapons and old books.
 Outdoor: Outdoor displays include a ferret armoured car, radar system, aeroplanes, locomotives and the former chief minister of Selangor cars.
 Sports: Highlights the history of sports and famous sportsmen in Malaysia.
 Temporary: In 2006, an exhibition on Malay ghosts and folklore was displayed in the museum.

See also
 List of museums in Malaysia

References

External links
 

1989 establishments in Malaysia
Museums established in 1989
Museums in Selangor
History museums in Malaysia
Shah Alam